Protoporphyrin ferrochelatase (EC 4.98.1.1, formerly EC 4.99.1.1, or ferrochelatase; systematic name protoheme ferro-lyase (protoporphyrin-forming)) is an enzyme encoded by the FECH gene in humans. Ferrochelatase catalyses the eighth and terminal step in the biosynthesis of heme, converting protoporphyrin IX into heme B. It catalyses the reaction:
protoheme + 2 H+ = protoporphyrin + Fe2+

Function 

Ferrochelatase catalyzes the insertion of ferrous iron into protoporphyrin IX in the heme biosynthesis pathway to form heme B. The enzyme is localized to the matrix-facing side of the inner mitochondrial membrane. Ferrochelatase is the best known member of a family of enzymes that add divalent metal cations to tetrapyrrole structures. For example, magnesium chelatase adds magnesium to protoporphyrin IX in the first step of bacteriochlorophyll biosynthesis.

Heme B is an essential cofactor in many proteins and enzymes. In particular, heme b plays a key role as the oxygen carrier in hemoglobin in red blood cells and myoglobin in muscle cells. Furthermore, heme B is found in cytochrome b, a key component in Q-cytochrome c oxidoreductase (complex III) in oxidative phosphorylation.

Structure 
Human ferrochelatase is a homodimer composed of two 359 amino acid polypeptide chains. It has a total molecular weight of 85.07 kDa. Each subunit is composed of five regions: a mitochondrial localization sequence, the N terminal domain, two folded domains, and a C terminal extension. Residues 1–62 form a mitochondrial localization domain that is cleaved in post-translational modification. The folded domains contain a total of 17 α-helices and 8 β-sheets. The C terminal extension contains three of the four cysteine residues (Cys403, Cys406, Cys411) that coordinate the catalytic iron–sulfur cluster (2Fe-2S). The fourth coordinating cysteine resides in the N-terminal domain (Cys196).

The active pocket of ferrocheltase consists of two hydrophobic "lips" and a hydrophilic interior. The hydrophobic lips, consisting of the highly conserved residues 300–311, face the inner mitochondrial membrane and facilitate the passage of the poorly soluble protoporphyrin IX substrate and the heme product via the membrane. The interior of the active site pocket contains a highly conserved acidic surface that facilitates proton extraction from protoporphyrin. Histidine and aspartate residues roughly 20 angstroms from the center of the active site on the mitochondrial matrix side of the enzyme coordinate metal binding.

Mechanism 

The mechanism of human protoporphyrin metalation remains under investigation. Many researchers have hypothesized distortion of the porphyrin macrocycle as key to catalysis. Researchers studying Bacillus subtilis ferrochelatase propose a mechanism for iron insertion into protoporphyrin in which the enzyme tightly grips rings B, C, and D while bending ring A 36o. Normally planar, this distortion exposes the lone pair of electrons on the nitrogen in ring A to the Fe+2 ion. Subsequent investigation revealed a 100o distortion in protoporphyrin bound to human ferrochelatase.  A highly conserved histidine residue (His183 in B. subtilis, His263 in humans) is essential for determining the type of distortion, as well as acting as the initial proton acceptor from protoporphyrin. Anionic residues form a pathway facilitating proton movement away from the catalytic histidine. Frataxin chaperones iron to the matrix side of ferrochelatase, where aspartate and histidine residues on both proteins coordinate iron transfer into ferrochelatase. Two arginine and tyrosine residues in the active site (Arg164, Tyr165) may perform the final metalation.

Clinical significance 

Defects in ferrochelatase create a buildup of protoporphyrin IX, causing erythropoietic protoporphyria (EPP). The disease can result from a variety of mutations in FECH, most of which behave in an autosomal dominant manner with low clinical penetrance. Clinically, patients with EPP present with a range of symptoms, from asymptomatic to suffering from an extremely painful photosensitivity. In less than five percent of cases, accumulation of protoporphyrin in the liver results in cholestasis (blockage of bile flow from the liver to the small intestine) and terminal liver failure.

In cases of lead poisoning, lead inhibits ferrochelatase activity, in part resulting in porphyria.

Interactions 

Ferrochelatase interacts with numerous other enzymes involved in heme biosynthesis, catabolism, and transport, including protoporphyrinogen oxidase, 5-aminolevulinate synthase, ABCB10, ABCB7, succinyl-CoA synthetase, and mitoferrin-1. Multiple studies have suggested the existence of an oligomeric complex that enables substrate channeling and coordination of overall iron and porphyrin metabolism throughout the cell. N-methylmesoporphyrin (N-MeMP) is a competitive inhibitor with protoporphyrin IX and is thought to be a transition state analog. As such, N-MeMP has been used extensively as a stabilizing ligand for x-ray crystallography structure determination. Frataxin acts as the Fe+2 chaperone and complexes with ferrochelatase on its mitochondrial matrix side. Ferrochelatase can also insert other divalent metal ions into protoporphyrin. Some ions, such as Zn+2, Ni, and Co form other metalloporphyrins while heavier metal ions such as Mn, Pb, Hg, and Cd inhibit product release after metallation.

See also 
 Lyases
 Erythropoietic protoporphyria
 Sirohydrochlorin ferrochelatase
 Zinc protoporphyrin

References

Further reading

External links 
 
 

EC 4.99.1
Peripheral membrane proteins
Genes on human chromosome 18